The 1958–59 Irish Cup was the 79th edition of the premier knock-out cup competition in Northern Irish football. 

Glenavon won the cup for the 2nd time, defeating the holders Ballymena United 2–0 in the final replay at Windsor Park after the first match had finished in a draw.

Results

First round

|}

Replay

|}

Second replay

|}

Quarter-finals

|}

Replay

|}

Semi-finals

|}

Final

Replay

References

External links
The Rec.Sport.Soccer Statistics Foundation - Northern Ireland - Cup Finals

Irish Cup seasons
1958–59 in Northern Ireland association football
1958–59 domestic association football cups